Visual Tool Markup Language (VTML) is a user interface markup language used by Macromedia HomeSite, ColdFusion Studio and JRun Studio. VTML is used for tag editors and custom dialogs shipped with these applications and can be used to extend the user interface and to support additional tag-based languages.

VTML is documented in help files included with these applications or available online, notably in the "VTML Reference" and "Customizing the Development Environment" sections.

Wizard Markup Language (WIZML) is a sub-language of VTML that defines the logic used by user interface wizards and tag editors.

References

External links
HomeSite Documentation
Customizing the Development Environment, part of 'Using HomeSite' 5.0 livedocs
Extending ColdFusion Studio, by Ben Forta
VTML, by Marjolein Katsma
VTML by Example (part 1), by Christian Schneider
VTML by Example (part 2), by Christian Schneider
WIZML by Example - ColdFusion Studio Wizards, by Christian Schneider

User interface markup languages